Heaven's Hell is a 2019 Nigerian psychological drama film, produced and directed by Katung Aduwak; it stars an ensemble cast which includes Nse Ikpe Etim, Fabian Adeoye Lojede, Bimbo Akintola, Chet Anekwe, Damilola Adegbite, OC Ukeje, Kalu Ikeagwu, Femi Jacobs, Bimbo Manuel and Gideon Okeke. It is majorly financed by BGL Asset Management Ltd and One O Eight Media, with production support of other partners such as Hashtag Media House and Aberystwyth University.

The film, which was inspired by a true story, is set in Lagos city and tells the story of two housewives whose bond of friendship seem unbreakable, but is filled with deceit and betrayal; in the midst of the darkness that hovers above their relationships with their spouses. The film was initially scheduled for release on 23 January 2015, but was delayed due to censorship. It was eventually released on 10 May 2019.

Cast
Fabian Adeoye Lojede as Edward Henshaw
Nse Ikpe Etim as Alice Henshaw
Chet Anekwe as Jeff Aliu
Bimbo Akintola as Tsola Aliu
Damilola Adegbite as Janet Cole
OC Ukeje as Ahmed
Kalu Ikeagwu as Efosa Elliots
Gideon Okeke as Akanimo
Femi Jacobs as Detective Popoola
Bimbo Manuel as Chief Justice
Katherine Obiang as Tara
Linda Ejiofor as Secretary
Waje Iruobe as Estate Agent

Production
Heaven’s Hell has been flagged as a film that intends to help fight domestic violence against women and children. Aduwak states: "...as it seems, domestic violence is still handled with kid's gloves in this part of the world. Ultimately, I want Heaven’s Hell to liberate people. I want it to inspire someone to get out of a bad relationship [..] whatever it can accomplish to make the world a saner place". The development of the film took a year, after which principal photography commenced on 9 April 2013 in Lagos with the major cast. A couple of scenes were shot in Kirikiri Maximum and Medium Security Prisons in Lagos. Filming in Lagos lasted over three weeks, after which shooting was moved to Wales, where some scenes were also filmed. The film was shot using Sony F55 cameras, and the film's production was led by Jeffrey Smith. The project was majorly financed by BGL Asset Management Ltd & One O Eight Media, with production support of other partners such as Hashtag Media House, and Aberystwyth University.

Soundtrack
The official soundtrack from the film, titled "3rd World War", was performed by Jesse Jagz and Femi Kuti, and was released on 7 August 2013.

Promotions and release
A press conference for the film was held on 8 April 2013 at Clear Essence, Ikoyi, Lagos, where it was announced that the film would be released in the third quarter of 2013. It was however postponed due to unknown reasons.In December 2014, FilmOne Distribution officially announced that the film would be released on 23 January 2015; it has however been delayed by the Nigerian Films and Video Censors Board due to the presence of some "explicit and inciting content". The filmmakers have been advised to re-edit the film before it can be released. The distribution of the film which was initially helmed by FilmOne, has now been taken over by Genesis Distribution. The film was eventually released theatrically on 10 May 2019.

References

External links

2010s psychological drama films
Films about domestic violence
Nigerian drama films
English-language Nigerian films
Films shot in Lagos
Films set in Lagos
Films shot in Wales
2019 drama films
2019 films
2010s English-language films